Roy Fosdahl (20 April 1911 – 5 February 1980) was a Norwegian footballer. He played in two matches for the Norway national football team from 1930 to 1934.

References

External links
 

1911 births
1980 deaths
Norwegian footballers
Norway international footballers
People from Halden
Association football goalkeepers
Kvik Halden FK players